"Tarantula" is the second single released from Mystikal's fifth album of the same name, it featured singer, Butch Cassidy. It was released on February 19, 2002 and was produced Scott Storch. Tarantula ended Mystikal's streak of three successful singles ("Shake Ya Ass", "Danger (Been So Long)" and "Bouncin' Back (Bumpin' Me Against the Wall)"), only making it to number 76 on the Hot R&B/Hip-Hop Singles & Tracks. The music video was directed by Jessy Terrero.

Single track listing

A-Side
"Tarantula" (Clean)- 4:11 
"Tarantula" (Dirty)- 4:11 
"Tarantula" (Instrumental)- 4:11

B-Side
"If It Ain't Live, It Ain't Me" (Clean)- 4:11 
"If It Ain't Live, It Ain't Me" (Dirty)- 4:11 
"If It Ain't Live, It Ain't Me" (Instrumental)- 4:11

References

2002 singles
2002 songs
Jive Records singles
Music videos directed by Jessy Terrero
Mystikal songs
Song recordings produced by Scott Storch
Songs written by Mystikal